Following are lists of all rugby league footballers who have played first-grade for the South Sydney Rabbitohs Rugby League Football Club.

Players and statistics
Correct as of round 2 of the 2023 NRL season

Club Internationals – Australia 

The following players have represented Australia whilst playing for South Sydney.

 Tommy Anderson
 Jim Armstrong
 Alf Blair
 Cec Blinkhorn
 Ray Branighan
 Tim Brasher
 Arthur Butler
 Billy Cann
 Mark Carroll
 Clive Churchill
 Michael Cleary
 Arthur Conlin
 Damien Cook
 Ron Coote
 Les Cowie
 Frank Curran
 Steve Darmody
 Les Davidson
 Jim Davis
 Denis Donoghue
 Terry Fahey
 Harry Finch
 Bryan Fletcher
 Dane Gagai
 Herb Gilbert
 Campbell Graham
 Bob Grant
 John Graves
 Howard Hallett
 Ernie Hammerton
 Greg Hawick
 Bob Honan
 Greg Inglis
 Brian James
 Alex Johnston
 Harry Kadwell
 Clem Kennedy
 John Kerwick
 Jack Leveson
 Eric Lewis
 Jimmy Lisle
 Bob McCarthy
 Eddie McGrath
 Paddy Maher
 Latrell Mitchell
 Ian Moir
 Cameron Murray
 Ray Norman
 Alf O'Connor
 Frank O'Connor
 John O'Neill
 Arthur Oxford
 George Piggins
 Denis Pittard
 Bernie Purcell
 Jack Rayner
 Eddie Root
 John Rosewell
 Paul Sait
 John Sattler
 Eric Simms
 Bill Spence
 Gary Stevens
 David Taylor
 George Treweek
 Dylan Walker
 Elwyn Walters
 Benny Wearing
 Jack Why
 Percy Williams

Note that Jim Morgan was selected as a reserve for Australia whilst as a player for South Sydney but did not actually take the field in the representative match.

Represented Australia before or after playing with South Sydney 

The following players have represented Australia either before or after they played for South Sydney.

Royce Ayliffe
Peter Burge
Hugh Byrne
Darrel Chapman
Michael Crocker
Ron Crowe
Col Donohoe
Percy Fairall
Robbie Farah
Dane Gagai
Bob Gehrke
Brian Hambly
Shannon Hegarty
Terry Hill
Ray Hines
Johnny Hutchinson
Luke Keary
Matt King
Adam MacDougall
Ian Mackay
Mark McGaw
Keith Middleton
Jim Morgan
Adam Muir
Webby Neill
Rex Norman
Claud O'Donnell
Julian O'Neill
Bryan Orrock
Bill Owen
David Peachey
Russell Richardson
Ian Roberts
Craig Salvatori
Jim Serdaris
Glenn Stewart
Billy Thompson
Peter Tunks
Lote Tuqiri
Harry Wells
Craig Wing

Club Internationals – New Zealand 

The following players have represented New Zealand whilst playing for South Sydney.

 Roy Asotasi
 David Kidwell
 David Fa'alogo
 Bryson Goodwin
 Terry Hermansson
 Issac Luke
 Gene Ngamu
 Jeremy Smith
 Tyran Smith
 Nigel Vagana1
 Jason Williams

1 Represented New Zealand All Golds in 2007

Club Internationals – Other Countries 

The following players have represented other rugby league playing nations (i.e. other than Australia or New Zealand) whilst playing for South Sydney.

 Neccrom Areaiiti (Cook Islands)
 Roy Asotasi (Samoa)
 George Burgess (England)
 Sam Burgess (England)
 Tom Burgess (England)
 Angelo Dymock (Tonga)
 Robbie Farah (Lebanon) 
 Tere Glassie (Cook Islands)
 Robert Jennings (Tonga)
 Alex Johnston (Papua New Guinea)
 Apisai Koroisau (Fiji)
 Jeff Lima (Samoa)
 Manase Manuokafoa (Tonga)
 Daryl Millard (Fiji)
 Sitiveni Moceidreke (Fiji)
 Michael Oldfield (Tonga)
 Eddie Paea (Tonga)
 Alan Skene (South Africa)
 Jaydn Su'a (Samoa)
 Fetuli Talanoa (Tonga)
 Tevita Tatola (Tonga)
 Lote Tuqiri (Fiji)
 Nigel Vagana (Samoa)

Represented other countries before or after playing with South Sydney 

The following players have represented other rugby league playing nations (i.e. other than Australia) either before or after they played for South Sydney.

 Fred Anderson (South Africa)
 Bob Banham (New Zealand)
 John Burke (Great Britain)
 Adam Doueihi (Lebanon}
 David Fa'alogo (Samoa)
 Joe Galuvao (New Zealand)
 Henderson Gill (Great Britain)
 Phil Howlett (Tonga)
 Lee Jackson (Great Britain)
 Filimone Lolohea (Tonga)
 Bernie Lowther (New Zealand)
 Willie Manu (Tonga)
 Darren Maroon (Lebanon)
 Martin Masella (Tonga)
 Mark Minichiello (Italy)
 Eddy Pettybourne (Samoa, United States)
 Gary Price (Great Britain)
 Frank Puletua (Samoa)
 Ian Rubin (Russia)
 Sean Skelton (South Africa)
 James Storer (Fiji)
 Craig Smith (New Zealand)

Australian Test Captains
 
Arthur Hennessy (1908) 
Clive Churchill (1950–1955) 
John Sattler (1969–1970) 
Bob McCarthy (1973)

New Zealand Test Captains
 
Roy Asotasi (2007–2008)

Australian World Cup Captains
 
Clive Churchill (1954) 
Ron Coote (1970)

State Representatives

Prior to State of Origin
The following players have represented New South Wales in rugby league whilst playing for South Sydney.

 Tommy Anderson
 Jim Armstrong
 Tom Barry
 Alf Blair
 Cec Blinkhorn
 Ray Branighan
 Frank Brogan
 Os Brown
 Arthur Butler
 Harry Butler
 Billy Cann
 Alby Carr
 Harry Cavanough
 Clive Churchill
 Michael Cleary
 Arthur Conlin
 Ron Coote
 Les Cowie
 Jack Coxon
 Ron Crowe
 Frank Curran
 Jim Davis
 Jim Deeley
 Denis Donoghue
 Col Donohoe
 Johnny Dougherty
 Terry Fahey
 Fred Felsch
 Harry Finch
 Ed Fry
 Martin Gallagher
 Herb Gilbert
 Bill Gillespie
 Bob Grant
 John Graves
 Dick Green
 Howard Hallett
 Gary Hambly
 Ernie Hammerton
 Sid Harris

 Greg Hawick
 Arthur Hennessy
 Eddie Hilliard
 Bob Honan
 Clarrie Horder
 Harold Horder
 Bob Honeysett
 Brian James
 Dick Johnson
 Harry Kadwell
 Clem Kennedy
 John Kerwick
 Ernie Lapham
 Vic Lawrence
 Eric Lewis
 John Leveson
 Pat Maher
 Don Manson
 Arthur McCabe
 Bob McCarthy
 Ted McGrath
 Ian Moir
 Jim Morgan
 Jack Morrison
 Pat Murphy
 Fred Nelson
 Alf O'Connor
 Frank O'Connor
 John O'Neill
 Arthur Oxford
 George Piggins
 Denis Pittard
 Bernie Purcell
 Alan Quinlivan
 Oscar Quinlivan
 Jack Rayner
 Alan Righton
 Eddie Root
 John Rosewell
 Paul Sait
 John Sattler
 Vince Sheehan
 Eric Simms
 Bill Spence
 Albert Spillane
 Gary Stevens
 Frank Storie
 Johnno Stuntz
 Jim Tait
 Ron Taylor
 Hash Thompson
 George Treweek
 Benny Wearing
 Elwyn Walters
 Dave Watson
 Jack Why
 Percy Williams

State of Origin
The following players have represented either New South Wales or Queensland in State of Origin rugby league whilst playing for South Sydney.

New South Wales
David Boyle
Tim Brasher
Mark Carroll
Damien Cook
Angus Crichton
Les Davidson
Mario Fenech
Bryan Fletcher
Gary Hambly
Graham Lyons
Tony Melrose
Nathan Merritt
Cameron Murray
Ziggy Niszczot
Tony Rampling
Adam Reynolds
Cody Walker
Craig Wing

Queensland
Mitch Brennan
Michael Crocker
Dane Gagai
Ashley Harrison
Greg Inglis
Ethan Lowe
Chris McQueen
Julian O'Neill
Jaydn Su'a
David Taylor
Ben Te'o

Captains (since 1908) 

Arthur Hennessy (1908), (1910)
Arthur Butler (1908–1909), (1911–1915)
John Rosewell (1908)
Harry Butler (1908–1909)
Arthur Conlin (1908–1910)
Jack Leveson (1910)
Billy Cann (1911)
Bill Spence (1911)
Howard Hallett (1915), (1918–1919), (1922)
Roy Almond (1916–1917)
Rex Norman (1916)
George McGowan(1917)
Arthur Oxford (1918–1921) 
John Kerwick (1919)
Bill Rowley (1919)
Cec Blinkhorn (1919)
Alf Blair (1922–1930)
Bill Gillespie (1923)
Harold Horder (1924)
Jack Lawrence (1924)
Vic Lawrence (1925)
Jim Breen (1927)
Pat Maher (1931)
George Treweek (1932–1934)
Percy Williams (1935)
Eric Lewis (1935–1937)
Fred Felsch (1938–1944)
Jack Walsh (1944)
Clem Kennedy (1945–1946)
Howard Hallett Jnr (1946)
Jack Rayner (1947–1956)
Clive Churchill (1957–1958)
Bernie Purcell (1959–1960)
Darrel Chapman (1961–1964)
Jimmy Lisle (1963–1966)
John Sattler (1967–1972)
Bob McCarthy (1973–1975)
Denis Pittard (1973)
Bob Grant (1974)
Gary Stevens (1974), (1976)
George Piggins (1977)
Paul Sait (1977–1978)
Darryl Bampton (1978)
Nathan Gibbs (1979–1982)
Ken Stewart (1978–1981)
Mitch Brennan (1981)
Ziggy Niszczot (1983–1984)
Mario Fenech (1985–1990)
Craig Coleman (1991)
Michael Andrews (1992–1993)
Dean Schifilliti (1994)
Lee Jackson (1995)
Craig Field (1995–1996)
Craig Salvatori (1996)
Sean Garlick (1997–1999)
Adam Muir  (2002)
Bryan Fletcher (2003–2005)
Ashley Harrison (2005)
Peter Cusack (2006–2007)
David Kidwell (2007–2008)
Roy Asotasi (2007–2012)
John Sutton (2008), (2011–2019)
Luke Stuart (2009–2010)
Michael Crocker (2011–2013)
Matt King (2012)
Sam Burgess (2012–2013), (2017–2019)
Greg Inglis (2015–2019)
Adam Reynolds (2015, 2020–2021)
Cody Walker (2021)
Mark Nicholls (2021)

George Piggins Medal
Since 2003 the South Sydney Rabbitohs have awarded the "George Piggins Medal" to their best and fairest player of the season.
2003: Bryan Fletcher
2004: Ashley Harrison
2005: Peter Cusack
2006: David Fa'alogo
2007: Roy Asotasi
2008: Luke Stuart
2009: John Sutton
2010: Issac Luke
2011: Nathan Merritt
2012: John Sutton
2013: Greg Inglis & John Sutton
2014: Sam Burgess
2015: Greg Inglis
2016: Sam Burgess

South Sydney "Dream Team" 

The South Sydney Rabbitohs' greatest club side in history, the "South Sydney Dream Team", was announced in Sydney on 29 July 2004. The team consists of 17 players and a coach representing the South Sydney Rabbitohs Football Club from 1908 through to 2004.

The team spans the history of the code of rugby league in Australia and has collectively played 2,135 first grade games for the South Sydney Rabbitohs, 158 games for New South Wales, 3 games for Queensland and 158 Tests for Australia.

The "South Sydney Dream Team" is:

Fullback – Clive Churchill (164 games for Souths between 1947 and 1958, 27 games for NSW, 34 Tests for Australia. Coached Souths to four premierships in 1967, 1968, 1970 and 1971).
Winger – Harold Horder (86 games for Souths between 1912 and 1919 & 1924, 9 games for NSW, 13 Tests for Australia).
Centre – Herb Gilbert (23 games for Souths between 1911 and 1912 & 1915, 3 games for NSW, 7 Tests for Australia).
Centre – Paul Sait (163 games for Souths between 1968 and 1978, 5 games for NSW, 7 Tests for Australia).
Winger – Ian Moir (118 games for Souths between 1952 and 1958, 10 games for NSW, 8 Tests for Australia).
Five-eighth – Jimmy Lisle (102 games for Souths between 1962 and 1968, 8 games for NSW, 6 Tests for Australia).
Halfback – Bob Grant (136 games for Souths between 1966 and 1975, 2 games for NSW, 1 Test for Australia).
Lock – Ron Coote (151 games for Souths between 1964 and 1971, 13 games for NSW, 13 Tests for Australia).
Second Row – Bob McCarthy (211 games for Souths between 1963 and 1975 & 1978, 10 games for NSW, 10 Tests for Australia).
Second Row – George Treweek (120 games for Souths between 1926 and 1934, 7 games for NSW, 18 Tests for Australia).
Prop – John O'Neill (150 games for Souths between 1965 and 1971 & 1975–76, 5 games for NSW, 2 Tests for Australia).
Hooker – Elwyn Walters (129 games for Souths between 1967 and 1973, 11 games for NSW, 12 Tests for Australia).
Prop – John Sattler (Captain, 195 games for Souths between 1963 and 1972, 4 games for NSW, 3 games for Queensland, 4 Tests for Australia).
Reserve – Greg Hawick (84 games for Souths between 1950 and 1956, 8 games for NSW, 6 Tests for Australia).
Reserve – Ray Branighan (52 games for Souths between 1968 and 1971, 5 games for NSW, 8 Tests for Australia).
Reserve – Ian Roberts (65 games for Souths between 1986 and 1989, 11 games for NSW, 13 Tests for Australia).
Reserve – Les Cowie (176 games for Souths between 1947 and 1957, 10 games for NSW, 6 Tests for Australia).
Coach – Jack Rayner (Played 194 games for Souths between 1946 and 1957, 11 games for NSW, 5 Tests for Australia. Coached Souths to five premierships in 1950, 1951, 1953, 1954 and 1955).

"The Magnificent XIII" 

In 2002 on the Rabbitohs readmission to the competition, The Magnificent XIII, a team consisting of great South Sydney players over the years was selected by a panel of rugby league journalists and former Souths players and coaches. The team consists of 17 players (four being reserves) and a coach representing the South Sydney Rabbitohs Football Club from 1908 through to 2002.

References

Footnotes

Works cited 

Lists of Australian rugby league players
 
players
Sydney-sport-related lists
National Rugby League lists